Shahram Goudarzi (born April 4, 1987)is an Iranian football player.
He currently plays for Pars Jonoubi in the Persian Gulf Pro League.

Club career
He was scouted by Bargh Shiraz and played for them from 2005 to 2008. In June 2008 he join rival team Fajr Sepasi.

Club Career Statistics
Last Update  17 August 2012 

 Assist Goals

International career
He is a member of Iran national under-23 football team.
He also has played for Iran national under-20 football team in AFC Youth Championship 2006, scoring the game-tying goal in the opening game that Iran went on to win 3-0.

References 

Fajr Sepasi players
Bargh Shiraz players
Sanat Mes Kerman F.C. players
Shahrdari Tabriz players
Pars Jonoubi Jam players
People from Shiraz
Living people
1987 births
Gostaresh Foulad F.C. players
Tractor S.C. players
Association football forwards
Iranian footballers
Sportspeople from Fars province